Khatkhari is a village in Singrauli district of Madhya Pradesh state of India.

References

Villages in Singrauli district